Juan Ramos may refer to:

 Juan Ramos (soccer) (born 1971), retired American soccer defender
 Juan Antonio Ramos (born 1976), Spanish taekwondo practitioner
 Juan Soberanes Ramos (born 1968), Mexican professional boxer
 Juan Manuel Ramos (born 1996), Uruguayan footballer

See also
Juan Ramis (1746–1819), Menorcan lawyer, writer and historian